PennWest may refer to:

 Obsidian Energy, a Canadian energy company previously known as Penn West Exploration Ltd., Penn West Petroleum and Penn West Energy Trust
 Pennsylvania Western University, a public university in the Pennsylvania State System of Higher Education

See also 

 Penn, West Midlands
 West Penn Railways